Sophie Elizabeth Cunningham (born August 16, 1996) is an American professional basketball player for the Phoenix Mercury of the Women’s National Basketball Association (WNBA)

College career
Cunningham played four seasons of college basketball at the University of Missouri in Columbia, Missouri for the Tigers.

Statistics 

|-
| style="text-align:left;"| 2015–16
| style="text-align:left;"| Missouri
| 32 || 32 || 30.1 || .502 || .356 || .831 || 5.8 || 3.0 || 1.1 || 0.3 || 2.4 || 14.0
|-
| style="text-align:left;"| 2016–17
| style="text-align:left;"| Missouri
| 31 || 31 || 32.9 || .482 || .379 || .848 || 5.3 || 3.4 || 0.9 || 0.3 || 3.4 || 17.5
|-
| style="text-align:left;"| 2017–18
| style="text-align:left;"| Missouri
| 31 || 31 || 32.7 || .542 || .457 || .836 || 4.7 || 3.0 || 0.8 || 0.1 || 3.0 || 18.5
|-
| style="text-align:left;"| 2018–19
| style="text-align:left;"| Missouri
| 35 || 35 || 34.3 || .481 || .403 || .839 || 5.9 || 2.8 || 1.2 || 0.3 || 2.9 || 17.8
|-
| style="text-align:center;" colspan="2"| Career
| 129 || 129 || 32.5 || .501 || .403 || .839 || 5.4 || 3.0 || 1.0 || 0.3 || 2.9 || 17.0

Professional career

Phoenix Mercury (2019-present)
Cunningham was selected as the thirteenth overall pick of the 2019 WNBA draft by the Phoenix Mercury. After making the final roster with the Mercury, Cunningham would play under head coach Sandy Brondello and alongside the likes of Brittney Griner, DeWanna Bonner, and Diana Taurasi. Cunningham is the eighth Missouri alum to be drafted into the WNBA and is the highest selection for a former Tiger.

WNBA career statistics

Regular season

|-
| style="text-align:left;"| 2019
| style="text-align:left;"| Phoenix
| 32 || 5 || 12.2 || .354 || .304 || .882 || 1.4 ||	0.8 || 0.3 || 0.1 || 0.6 || 3.1 
|-
| style="text-align:left;"| 2020
| style="text-align:left;"| Phoenix
| 21 ||	11 || 18.9 || .385 || .235 || .880 || 1.0 || 0.8 || 0.5 || 0.1 || 0.7 || 5.0 
|-
| style="text-align:left;"| 2021
| style="text-align:left;"| Phoenix
| 30 || 4 || 17.5 || .437 || .410 || .704 || 2.0 || 1.1 || 0.5 || 0.2 || 0.5 || 5.6
|-
| style="text-align:left;"| 2022
| style="text-align:left;"| Phoenix
| 28 || 20 || 29.5 || .449 || .400 || .875 || 4.4 || 1.6 || 1.0 || 0.4 || 1.0 || 12.6
|-
| style='text-align:left;'| Career
| style='text-align:left;'| 4 years, 1 team
| 111 || 40 || 19.2 || .423 || .366 || .843 || 2.3 || 1.1 || 0.6 || 0.2 || 0.7 || 6.5	 
|}

Postseason

|-
| style="text-align:left;"| 2019
| style="text-align:left;"| Phoenix
| 1 ||	0 || 8.0 || 1.000 || 1.000 || .000 || 0.0 || 0.0 || 0.0 || 0.0 || 0.0 || 3.0 
|-
| style="text-align:left;"| 2020
| style="text-align:left;"| Phoenix
| 2 || 0 || 9.5 || .500 || .333 || .000 || 1.0 || 0.0 || 0.0 || 0.0 || 1.5 || 2.5 
|-
| style="text-align:left;"| 2021
| style="text-align:left;"| Phoenix
| 8 || 2 || 17.5 || .484 || .565 || 1.000 || 2.1 ||	0.8 || 0.3 || 0.9 || 0.8 || 6.4
|-
| style="text-align:left;"| 2022
| style="text-align:left;"| Phoenix
| 2 || 2 || 31.0 || .455 || .375 || .333 || 2.5 || 2.0 || 0.5 || 0.0 || 2.5 || 7.5
|-
| style='text-align:left;'| Career
| style='text-align:left;'| 4 years, 1 team
| 13 ||	4 || 17.6 || .489 || .514 || .625 || 1.8 || 0.8 || 0.2 || 0.5 || 1.6 || 5.7	 
|}

References

External links 
Missouri Tigers bio

1996 births
Living people
All-American college women's basketball players
American women's basketball players
Basketball players from Missouri
McDonald's High School All-Americans
Missouri Tigers women's basketball players
Phoenix Mercury draft picks
Phoenix Mercury players
Shooting guards
Sportspeople from Columbia, Missouri
Rock Bridge High School alumni